Jasper A. Vrugt (born 1976) is a Dutch scientist/engineer/applied mathematician known for his work in the earth sciences: surface hydrology, soil physics, hydrogeophysics, hydrometeorology, and geophysics. Vrugt is an assistant professor at the University of California, Irvine and holds a joint appointment in the Department of Civil and Environmental Engineering and the Department of Earth System Science. He also holds a part-time appointment as associate professor at the University of Amsterdam, Faculty of Science (CGE).

Life and career

Vrugt has received several awards.  He received the 2011 Donath Medal (Young Scientist Award) of the Geological Society of America (GSA). As recipient of this medal, Dr. Vrugt was made GSA Fellow in 2012. In 2010, he received the James B. Macelwane Medal of the American Geophysical Union (AGU) for outstanding contributions in surface hydrology, soil physics, and hydrometeorology, and was simultaneously elected AGU Fellow. In the same year, he was also recognized with the Outstanding Young Scientist Award from the European Geosciences Union (EGU),. Vrugt is the first scientist to receive all three honors:  the Donath Medal (GSA), James B. Macelwane Medal (AGU) and the Outstanding Young Scientist Award (EGU).

He  is Associate Editor of  Water Resources Research.

List of scientific accomplishments and awards

Awards and recognition
Sir Frederick McMaster Fellowship, CSIRO
Fellow, Geological Society of America (GSA)
Editors' Choice Award, Water Resources Research, American Geophysical Union
Fellow, American Geophysical Union
Young Scientist Award (Donath Medal), Geological Society of America
Young Outstanding Scientist Award, European Geophysical Union
James B. Macelwane Medalist, American Geophysical Union
Early Career Award in Soil Physics, Soil Science Society of America
Hydrology Prize 2004 - 2006, Netherlands Hydrological Society (NHV)
Elsevier Top 50 of most talented young people in the Netherlands

Photographs

References

External links 
 Vrugt's Publications
 faculty.sites.uci.edu/jasper/
 University of California, Irvine
 University of Amsterdam, Institute for Biodiversity and Ecosystem Dynamics (IBED)
 Nederlandse Hydrologische Vereniging (NHV) / Dutch Hydrology Society 
 Water Resources Research
 Vadose Zone Journal
 Hydrology and Earth System Sciences
 Elsevier: Environmental Modeling & Software 
 Sir Frederick McMaster Fellowship 

/

Living people
1976 births
Academic staff of the University of Amsterdam
Hydrologists
University of Amsterdam alumni
University of California, Irvine faculty
Scientists from Amsterdam
Fellows of the Geological Society of America
Fellows of the American Geophysical Union